Liberty City is a census-designated place (CDP) in Gregg County, Texas, United States. The population was 2,721 at the 2020 census, up from 2,351 at the 2010 census.

Geography
Liberty City is located in western Gregg County at  (32.451388, -94.942781). Interstate 20 forms the southern edge of the CDP, with access from Exits 582 and 583. Texas State Highway 135 runs through the eastern side of Liberty City, leading north  to Gladewater and southeast  to Kilgore.

Demographics

As of the 2020 United States census, there were 2,721 people, 754 households, and 689 families residing in the CDP.

As of the census of 2000, there were 1,935 people, 690 households, and 569 families residing in the CDP. The population density was 493.0 people per square mile (190.6/km2). There were 747 housing units at an average density of 190.3/sq mi (73.6/km2). The racial makeup of the CDP was 93.02% White, 4.50% African American, 0.36% Native American, 0.16% Asian, 1.03% from other races, and 0.93% from two or more races. Hispanic or Latino of any race were 2.69% of the population.

There were 690 households, out of which 41.3% had children under the age of 18 living with them, 67.8% were married couples living together, 10.4% had a female householder with no husband present, and 17.5% were non-families. 14.5% of all households were made up of individuals, and 7.0% had someone living alone who was 65 years of age or older. The average household size was 2.80 and the average family size was 3.09.

In the CDP, the population was spread out, with 28.5% under the age of 18, 8.2% from 18 to 24, 27.8% from 25 to 44, 24.4% from 45 to 64, and 11.2% who were 65 years of age or older. The median age was 36 years. For every 100 females, there were 92.7 males. For every 100 females age 18 and over, there were 92.2 males.

The median income for a household in the CDP was $55,000, and the median income for a family was $55,913. Males had a median income of $36,250 versus $22,880 for females. The per capita income for the CDP was $20,443. About 1.5% of families and 1.9% of the population were below the poverty line, including 1.7% of those under age 18 and none of those age 65 or over.

Education
Liberty City is served by the Sabine Independent School District. The district's mascot is the Cardinal.

References

Census-designated places in Gregg County, Texas
Census-designated places in Texas
Longview metropolitan area, Texas